The Samoan archipelago is a chain of 16 islands and numerous seamounts covering  in the central South Pacific, south of the equator, about halfway between Hawaii and New Zealand, forming part of Polynesia and of the wider region of Oceania. The islands are Savaiʻi, Upolu, Tutuila, ’Uvea, Taʻū, Ofu, Olosega, Apolima, Manono, Nuʻutele, Niulakita, Nuʻulua, Namua, Fanuatapu, Rose Atoll, Nu'ulopa, as well as the submerged Vailuluʻu, Pasco banks, and Alexa Bank.

Tectonics 
The Samoan archipelago has many features that are consistent with a plume-driven hotspot model, including the currently active submarine volcano Vailuluʻu that anchors the eastern extremity. However, the chain's proximity to the northern end of the Tonga trench, and the presence of voluminous young volcanism on what should be the oldest (~5 my) western island Savaiʻi has induced controversy regarding a simple plume/hotspot model. The Samoan archipelago was most likely created by the Pacific Tectonic Plate traveling over a fixed hotspot.

Vailuluʻu is a volcanic seamount discovered in 1975. The basaltic seamount is considered to mark the current location of the Samoa hotspot. Two principal rift zones extend east and west from the summit, parallel to the trend of the Samoan hotspot. A third less prominent rift extends southeast of the summit.

Rose Atoll and Malulu seamount are likely remnants of where the path of either the Macdonald or Rarotonga hotspots crossed the path of the Samoa hotspot. Some seamounts in western Samoa ("Samoan Seamounts"), which were emplaced together with Tuvalu between 63 and 42 million years ago are likely remnants of the Rurutu hotspot.  These are also known as the "interloper seamounts". Other undated seamounts in Samoa have been linked to the Rurutu hotspot on the basis of geochemical evidence.

Islands of the Samoan archipelago

Climate 

Due to its positioning in the South Pacific Ocean, the Samoan archipelago is frequently hit by tropical cyclones between November and April.Samoa has an equatorial climate, with an average annual temperature of 26.5 °C (79.7 °F) and a main rainy season from November to April, although heavy rain may fall in any month.

Terrain 

The terrain of the larger islands consists of a narrow coastal plains with volcanic, rocky, rugged mountains in the interior. The Natural resources include hardwood forests, fish, and hydropower. The smaller islands are remnants of eroded volcanic tuff rings, some are just a coral reef atop the eroded cone of a defunct volcano.

Rose Atoll is the easternmost point of the archipelago and the southernmost point of the United States. American Samoa is home to the National Park of American Samoa.

References

Sources

See also
List of cities, towns and villages in Samoa
Districts of Samoa
Samoan Islands
Geography of American Samoa